Mark William Ortmann (born June 24, 1986) is a former American football offensive tackle. He was signed by the Carolina Panthers as an undrafted free agent after the 2010 NFL Draft, and was waived two months later. He later signed with the Atlanta Falcons on August 23, 2010, but was waived on August 28.  He had previously played four years for the Michigan Wolverines football team, where he was a regular starter at offensive tackle as a redshirt junior and senior for the 2008 and 2009 teams.

Early years
In high school, Ortmann played both tight end and offensive tackle at Klein High School in Klein, Texas where he also threw the discus (he was district champion as a junior) and shot put.  Ranked as the number 43 offensive tackle in the nation and the number 90 player in the state of Texas according to rivals.com.  He was a member of the National Honor Society as well as the Latin National Honor Society in high school.

College career

At Michigan, he was a three-year letterman, playing in 36 career contests, starting in 25 career games: made 21 starts at left tackle, two at right tackle and two at left guard during his career. He was elected captain as a fifth-year senior. During the October 31, 2009 game against the Illinois Fighting Illini he was involved in controversy when a punch he threw to the groin of Corey Liuget who had recovered a fumble became a noted video on YouTube. The action was expected to result in a suspension. No suspension was served.  He served as co-captain with Brandon Graham, Zoltan Mesko and Stevie Brown. Following the season, he was a co-recipient, along with Stephen Schilling, of the  Hugh R. Rader Jr. Award as Michigan's top offensive linemen. As a senior, he represented Texas in the February 6, 2010 Texas vs. The Nation Game.

Professional career
Ortmann signed as an undrafted free agent with the Carolina Panthers on April 24, 2010, after going undrafted in the 2010 NFL Draft. He was waived on June 17, 2010. The New England Patriots worked Ortmann out on August 3, 2010. 
Ortmann signed as an undrafted free agent with the Atlanta Falcons on August 23, 2010, after Quinn Ojinnaka was traded to the New England Patriots.  He was waived by the team on August 28.

Notes

External links

Michigan Wolverines football bio
Ortmann at NCAA.org

1986 births
Living people
Players of American football from Texas
American football offensive tackles
Michigan Wolverines football players
Carolina Panthers players
Sportspeople from Harris County, Texas
People from Klein, Texas